This list of theatrical animated feature films consists of animated films released by Universal Pictures, the film division of Comcast's NBCUniversal.

Universal Pictures releases films from Universal-owned and non-Universal owned animation studios. Most films listed below are from Illumination which began as the feature animation department of Universal, producing its first feature-length animated film Despicable Me in 2010. Beginning with How to Train Your Dragon: The Hidden World in 2019, Universal also released animated films by DreamWorks Animation, which was acquired by NBCUniversal in 2016.

Other studio units have also released films theatrically, primarily Universal Animation Studios which produced a few theatrical animated films before focusing  on animating television shows and direct-to-video films, and the studio's distribution unit, which acquires film rights from outside animation studios to release films under the Universal Pictures or Focus Features film labels. For example, Laika's stop-motion animated features were released by Universal through its Focus Features label. Other studios globally have released films through Universal Pictures which maintains distribution rights in certain territories.

Films

US releases

International releases

Upcoming

Highest-grossing films

Notes
Release Notes

Studio/Production Notes

See also
List of DreamWorks Animation productions
List of Universal Pictures films
List of Illumination productions
List of unproduced Universal Pictures animated projects

References

External links

American animated films
Universal Pictures animated films
Lists of Universal Pictures films
Lists of American animated films